The women's 72 kg competition in judo at the 1992 Summer Olympics in Barcelona was held on 28 July at the Palau Blaugrana. The gold medal was won by Kim Mi-jung of South Korea.

Results

Main brackets

Pool A

Pool B

Repechages

Repechage A

Repechage B

Final

Final classification

References

External links
 

W72
Judo at the Summer Olympics Women's Half Heavyweight
Olympics W72
Judo